Torcida Split is a HNK Hajduk Split supporters' group in Croatia with the branches in other countries, mostly, (but not exclusively) among Croat communities. Founded on 28 October 1950, Torcida is the oldest supporters group in Europe.

The group as a whole traditionally maintains good relations with the french Magic Fans (Saint-Etienne), the Czech Slavia Prague football club supporters, especially fan group Tribuna Sever, and has a long friendship with the portuguese fan group No Name Boys from Benfica.

History

The Torcida was founded in 1950 by a group of sailors from Korčula who had witnessed the passion of the crowd at the World Cup Final in Brazil.

Hajduk Split supporters, Torcida, were formed on 28 October 1950 by a group of students in Zagreb, namely Ante Dorić, Ante Ivanišević and Vjenceslav Žuvela. They took their name from the Brazilian fan group they idolized  , which comes from the Portuguese 'torcer' which means 'to cheer on'. "Hajduk lives forever" is their slogan.

References

External links
 Official Site

HNK Hajduk Split
Ultras groups
Sport in Split, Croatia
Croatian football supporters' associations
1950 establishments in Croatia